The Patent Reform Act may refer to:

The Patent Reform Act of 2005, an unenacted bill introduced in the 109th United States Congress
The Patent Reform Act of 2007, an unenacted bill introduced in the 110th United States Congress
The Patent Reform Act of 2009, an unenacted bill introduced in the 111th United States Congress
The Patent Reform Act of 2011, a bill introduced in the 112th United States Congress

Patent reform